The 1948 Ohio State Buckeyes football team represented Ohio State University in the 1948 Big Nine Conference football season. The Buckeyes compiled a 6–3 record, but lost to Michigan in the season finale. Ohio State outscored their opponents, 184–94, on the season.

Schedule

Coaching staff
 Wes Fesler, head coach, second year

1949 NFL draftees

References

Ohio State
Ohio State Buckeyes football seasons
Ohio State Buckeyes football